A living wage is defined as the minimum income necessary for a worker to meet their basic needs. This is not the same as a subsistence wage, which refers to a biological minimum, or a solidarity wage, which refers to a minimum wage tracking labor productivity. Needs are defined to include food, housing, and other essential needs such as clothing. The goal of a living wage is to allow a worker to afford a basic but decent standard of living through employment without government subsidies. Due to the flexible nature of the term "needs", there is not one universally accepted measure of what a living wage is and as such it varies by location and household type. A related concept is that of a family wage – one sufficient to not only support oneself, but also to raise a family. 

The living wage differs from the minimum wage in that the latter can fail to meet the requirements for a basic quality of life which leaves the worker to rely on government programs for additional income. Living wages have typically only been adopted in municipalities. In economic terms, a minimum wage is a price floor for labor created by a legal threshold, rather than a reservation wage created by price discovery. The living wage is one possible guideline for determining a target price floor, while a minimum wage is a policy to enforce a chosen price floor.

In the United Kingdom and New Zealand, advocates define a living wage to mean that a person working 40 hours a week, with no additional income, should be able to afford the basics for a modest but decent life, such as, food, shelter, utilities, transport, health care, and child care. Living wage advocates have further defined a living wage as the wage equivalent to the poverty line for a family of four. The income would have to allow the family to 'secure food, shelter, clothing, health care, transportation and other necessities of living in modern society'. A definition of a living wage used by the Greater London Authority (GLA) is the threshold wage, calculated as an income of 60% of the median, and an additional 15% to allow for unforeseen events. 

Living wage campaigns came about partially as a response to Reaganomics and Thatcherism in the US and UK, respectively, which shifted macroeconomic policy towards neoliberalism. A living wage, by increasing the purchasing power of low income workers, is supported by Keynesian and post-Keynesian economics which focuses on stimulating demand in order to improve the state of the economy.

History 

The concept of a living wage, though it was not defined as such, can be traced back to the works of ancient Greek philosophers such as Plato and Aristotle. Both argued for an income that considers needs, particularly those that ensure the communal good. Aristotle saw self-sufficiency as a requirement for happiness which he defined as, ‘that which on its own makes life worthy of choice and lacking in nothing’. As he placed the responsibility in ensuring that the poor could earn a sustainable living in the state, his ideas are seen as an early example of support for a living wage. 

The evolution of the concept can be seen later on in medieval scholars such as Thomas Aquinas who argued for a 'just wage'. The concept of a just wage was related to that of just prices, which were those that allowed everyone access to necessities. Prices and wages that prevented access to necessities were considered unjust as they would imperil the virtue of those without access.

In Wealth of Nations, Adam Smith recognized that rising real wages lead to the "improvement in the circumstances of the lower ranks of people" and are therefore an advantage to society. Growth and a system of liberty were the means by which the laboring poor were able to secure higher wages and an acceptable standard of living. Rising real wages are secured by growth through increasing productivity against stable price levels, i.e. prices not affected by inflation. A system of liberty, secured through political institutions whereupon even the "lower ranks of people" could secure the opportunity for higher wages and an acceptable standard of living.

Based on these writings, Smith advocated that labor should receive an equitable share of what labor produces. For Smith, this equitable share amounted to more than subsistence. Smith equated the interests of labor and the interests of land with overarching societal interests. He reasoned that as wages and rents rise, as a result of higher productivity, societal growth will occur thus increasing the quality of life for the greater part of its members.

Like Smith, supporters of a living wage argue that the greater good for society is achieved through higher wages and a living wage. It is argued that government should in turn attempt to align the interests of those pursuing profits with the interests of the labor in order to produce societal advantages for the majority of society. Smith argued that higher productivity and overall growth led to higher wages that in turn led to greater benefits for society. Based on his writings, one can infer that Smith would support a living wage commensurate with the overall growth of the economy. This, in turn, would lead to more happiness and joy for people, while helping to keep families and people out of poverty. Political institutions can create a system of liberty for individuals to ensure opportunity for higher wages through higher production and thus stable growth for society.

In 1891, Pope Leo XIII issued a papal bull entitled Rerum novarum, which is considered the Catholic Church's first expression of a view supportive of a living wage. The church recognized that wages should be sufficient to support a family. This position has been widely supported by the church since that time, and has been reaffirmed by the papacy on multiple occasions, such as by Pope Pius XI in 1931 Quadragesimo anno and again in 1961, by Pope John XXIII writing in the encyclical Mater et magistra. More recently, Pope John Paul II wrote, "Hence in every case a just wage is the concrete means of verifying the whole socioeconomic system and, in any case, of checking that it is functioning justly."

Contemporary thought 

Different ideas on a living wage have been advanced by modern campaigns that have pushed for localities to adopt them. Supporters of a living wage have argued that a wage is more than just compensation for labour. It is a means of securing a living and it leads to public policies that address both the level of the wage and its decency. Contemporary research by Andrea Werner and Ming Lim has analyzed the works of John Ryan, Jerold Waltman and Donald Stabile for their philosophical and ethical insights on a living wage.

John Ryan argues for a living wage from a rights perspective. He considers a living wage to be a right that all labourers are entitled to from the 'common bounty of nature'. He argues that private ownership of resources precludes access to them by others who would need them to maintain themselves. As such, the obligation to fulfill the right of a living wage rests on the owners and employers of private resources. His argument goes beyond that a wage should provide mere subsistence but that it should provide humans with the capabilities to 'develop within reasonable limits all [their] faculties, physical, intellectual, moral and spiritual.' A living wage for him is 'the amount of remuneration that is sufficient to maintain decently the laborer'.

Jerold Waltman, in A Case for the Living Wage, argues for a living wage not based on individual rights but from a communal, or 'civic republicanism', perspective. He sees the need for citizens to be connected to their community, and thus, sees individual and communal interests as inseparably bound. Two major problems that are antithetical to civic republicanism are poverty and inequality. A living wage is meant to address these by providing the material basis that allows individuals a degree of autonomy and prevents disproportionate income and wealth that would inevitably lead to a societal fissure between the rich and poor. A living wage further allows for political participation by all classes of people which is required to prevent the political interests of the rich from undermining the needs of the poor. These arguments for a living wage, taken together, can be seen as necessary elements for 'social sustainability and cohesion'.

Donald Stabile argues for a living wage based on moral economic thought and its related themes of sustainability, capability and externality. Broadly speaking, Stabile indicates that sustainability in the economy may require that people have the means for 'decent accommodation, transport, clothing and personal care'. He qualifies the statement as he sees individual necessities as contextual and therefore able to change over time, between cultures and under different macroeconomic circumstances. This suggests that the concept and definition of a living wage cannot be made objective over all places and in all times. Stabile's thoughts on capabilities make direct reference to Amartya Sen's work on capability approach. The tie-in with a living wage is the idea that income is an important, though not exclusive, means for capabilities. The enhancement of people's capabilities allows them to better function both in society and as workers. These capabilities are further passed down from parents to children. Finally, Stabile analyses the lack of a living wage as the imposition of negative externalities on others. These externalities take the form of depleting the stock of workers by 'exploiting and exhausting the workforce'. This leads to economic inefficiency as businesses end up overproducing their products due to not paying the full cost of labour.

Other contemporary accounts have taken up the theme of externalities arising due to a lack of living wage. Muilenburg and Singh see welfare programs, such as housing and school meals, as being a subsidy for employers that allow them to pay low wages. This subsidy, taking the form of an externality, is of course paid for by society in the form of taxes. This thought is repeated by Grimshaw who argues that employers offset the social costs of maintaining their workforce through tax credits, housing, benefits and other wage subsidies. The issue was raised during the Democratic party primary election of 2016 in the United States, when presidential candidate Bernie Sanders mentioned that "struggling working families should not have to subsidise the wealthiest family in the country", and therefore, implied that the large retailer Walmart, who is owned by the wealthiest family in the country, was not paying fair wages and was being subsidised by taxpayers.

Those in favor of living wage ordinances primarily research the negative impacts of insufficient minimum wages. In a cross-comparison between minimum wage and living wage ordinances, there are profound psychological impacts to living wage implementations. Those in favor of living wage oriented policies assert that it is important to acknowledge the region-specific costs that is severely lacking in minimum wage measurements. This line of thinking argues that a living wage can both enhance engagement and performance if implemented.

Implementations

Australia 

In Australia, the 1907 Harvester Judgement ruled that an employer was obliged to pay his employees a wage that guaranteed them a standard of living which was reasonable for "a human being in a civilised community" to live in "frugal comfort estimated by current... standards," regardless of the employer's capacity to pay. Justice H. B. Higgins established a wage of 7/- (7 shillings) per day or 42/- per week as a 'fair and reasonable' minimum wage for unskilled workers.

Bangladesh 
In Bangladesh, salaries are among the lowest in the world. During 2012 wages hovered around US$38 per month depending on the exchange rate. Studies by Professor Doug Miller during 2010 to 2012, has highlighted the evolving global trade practices in Towards Sustainable Labour Costing in UK Fashion Retail. This white paper published in 2013 by University of Manchester, appears to suggest that the competition among buying organisation has implications to low wages in countries such as Bangladesh. It has laid down a road map to achieve sustainable wages.

United Kingdom 

Municipal regulation of wage levels began in some towns in the British Isles in 1524. National minimum wage law began with Winston Churchill's Trade Boards Act 1909, and the Wages Councils Act 1945 set minimum wage standards in many sectors of the economy.  Wages Councils were abolished in 1993 and subsequently replaced with a single statutory national minimum wage by the National Minimum Wage Act 1998, which is still in force. The rates are reviewed each year by the country's Low Pay Commission. From 1 April 2016 the minimum wage has been paid as a mandatory National Living Wage for workers over 25. It is being phased in between 2016 and 2020 and is set at a significantly higher level than previous minimum wage rates. By 2020 it is expected to have risen to at least £9 per hour and represent a full-time annual pay equivalent to 60% of the median UK earnings. 

The National Living Wage is nevertheless lower than the value of the Living Wage calculated by the Living Wage Foundation. Some organisations voluntarily pay a living wage to their staff, at a level somewhat higher than the statutory level. From September 2014 all NHS Wales staff have been paid a minimum of the "living wage" recommended by the Living Wage Commission.  About 2,400 employees received an initial salary increase of up to £470 above the UK-wide Agenda for Change rates.

United States 
As of 2006, U.S. cities with living wage laws include Santa Fe and Albuquerque in New Mexico; San Francisco, California; and Washington, D.C. The city of Chicago, Illinois also passed a living wage ordinance in 2006, but it was vetoed by Mayor Richard M. Daley. Living wage laws typically cover only businesses that receive state assistance or have contracts with the government.

In 2014, Wisconsin Service Employees International Union teamed up with public officials against legislation to eliminate local living wages. According to U.S. Department of Labor data, Wisconsin Jobs Now - a non-profit organization fighting inequality through higher wages - has received at least $2.5 million from SEIU organizations from 2011 to 2013.

Although these ordinances are recent, a number of studies have attempted to measure the impact of these policies on wages and employment. Researchers have had difficulty measuring the impact of these policies because it is difficult to isolate a control group for comparison. A notable study defined the control group as the subset of cities that attempted to pass a living wage law but were unsuccessful. This comparison indicates that living wages raise the average wage level in cities, however, it reduces the likelihood of employment for individuals in the bottom percentile of wage distribution.

Impact
Research shows that minimum wage laws and living wage legislation impact poverty differently: evidence demonstrates that living wage legislation reduces poverty. The parties impacted by minimum wage laws and living wage laws differ as living wage legislation generally applies to a more limited sector of the population. It is estimated that workers who qualify for the living wage legislation are currently between 1-2% of the bottom quartile of wage distribution.Real life implications to living wage legislation is important to address. Raising wages can decrease job opportunities for low wage workers as it cuts costs for profit seeking organizations and companies. The pool gets smaller despite an increase in wage rates.

Neumark and Adams, in their paper, "Do living wage ordinances reduce urban poverty?", state, "There is evidence that living wage ordinances modestly reduce the poverty rates in locations in which these ordinances are enacted. However, there is no evidence that state minimum wage laws do so."

A study carried out in Hamilton, Canada by Zeng and Honig indicated that living wage workers have higher affective commitment and lower turnover intention. Workers paid a living wage were more likely to support the organization they work for in various ways including: "protecting the organizations public image, helping colleagues solve problems, improving their skills and techniques, providing suggestions or advice to a management team, and caring about the organization." The authors interpret these finding through social exchange theory, which points out the mutual obligation employers and employees feel towards each other when employees perceive they are provided favorable treatment.

Living wage estimates
As of 2003, there are 122 living wage ordinances in American cities and an additional 75 under discussion. Article 23 of the United Nations Universal Declaration of Human Rights states that "Everyone who works has the right to just and favourable remuneration ensuring for himself and for his family an existence worthy of human dignity."

In addition to legislative acts, many corporations have adopted voluntary codes of conduct. The Sullivan Principles in South Africa are an example of a voluntary code of conduct that state that firms should compensate workers to at least cover their basic needs.

In the table below, cross national comparable living wages were estimated for twelve countries and reported in local currencies and purchasing power parity (PPP). Living wage estimates for the year 2000 range from US$1.7 PPP per hour, in low-income examples, to approximately US$11.6 PPP per hour, in high-income examples.

Living wage estimates vary considerably by area, and may be calculated in different ways. In a 2019 report, the U.S. advocacy group National Low Income Housing Coalition calculated the necessary full-time hourly wage to spend 30% of income on rental of a fair-market, 2-bedroom apartment. Estimates range from a high of $36.82/hr in Hawaii (where minimum wage is $10.10/hr) to $14.26 in Arkansas (the lowest state, raising its minimum from $9.25 to $11/hr) and $9.59/hr in Puerto Rico (where minimum wage is $7.25/hr).

Living wage movements

Living Wage Foundation

The Living Wage Campaign in the United Kingdom originated in London, where it was launched in 2001 by members of the community organisation London Citizens (now Citizens UK). It engaged in a series of Living Wage campaigns and in 2005 the Greater London Authority established the Living Wage Unit to calculate the London Living Wage, although the authority had no power to enforce it. The London Living Wage was developed in 2008 when Trust for London awarded a grant of over £1 million for campaigning, research and an employer accreditation scheme. The Living Wage campaign subsequently grew into a national movement with local campaigns across the UK. The Joseph Rowntree Foundation funded the Centre for Research in Social Policy (CRSP) at Loughborough University to calculate a UK-wide Minimum Income Standard (MIS) figure, an average across the whole of the UK independent of the higher living costs in London.

In 2011 the CRSP used the MIS as the basis for developing a standard model for setting the UK Living Wage outside of London. Citizens UK, a nationwide community organising institution developed out of London Citizens, launched the Living Wage Foundation and Living Wage Employer mark. Since 2011, the Living Wage Foundation has accredited thousands of employers that pay its proposed living wage. The living wage in London is calculated by GLA Economics and the CRSP calculates the out-of-London Living Wage. Their recommended hourly rates for 2015 are £9.40 for London and £8.25 for the rest of the UK. These rates are updated annually in November. In January 2016 the Living Wage Foundation set up a new Living Wage Commission to oversee the calculation of the Living Wage rates in the UK.

In 2012, research into the costs and benefits of a living wage in London was funded by the Trust for London and carried out by Queen Mary University of London. Further research was published in 2014 in a number of reports on the potential impact of raising the UK's statutory national minimum wage to the same level as the Living Wage Foundation's living wage recommendation. This included two reports funded by the Trust for London and carried out by the Institute for Public Policy Research (IPPR) and Resolution Foundation: "Beyond the Bottom Line" and "What Price a Living Wage?" Additionally, Landman Economics published "The Economic Impact of Extending the Living Wage to all Employees in the UK".

A 2014 report by the Living Wage Commission, chaired by Doctor John Sentamu, the Archbishop of York, recommended that the UK government should pay its own workers a "living wage", but that it should be voluntary for the private sector. Data published in late 2014 by New Policy Institute and Trust for London found 20% of employees in London were paid below the Living Wage Foundation's recommended living wage between 2011 and 2013. The proportion of residents paid less than this rate was highest in Newham (37%) and Brent (32%). Research by the Office for National Statistics in 2014 indicated that at that time the proportion of jobs outside London paying less than the living wage was 23%. The equivalent figure within London was 19%. Research by Loughborough University, commissioned by Trust for London, shows 4 in 10 Londoners cannot afford a decent standard of living - that is one that allows them to meet their basic needs and participate in society at a minimum level. This is significantly higher than the 30% that fall below the standard in the UK as a whole. This represents 3.5 million Londoners, an increase of 400,000 since 2010/11. The research highlights the need to improve incomes through better wages, mainly, the London Living Wage, to ensure more Londoners reach a decent standard of living.

Ed Miliband, the leader of the Labour Party in opposition from 2010 until 2015, supported a living wage and proposed tax breaks for employers who adopted it. The Labour Party has implemented a living wage in some local councils which it controls, such as in Birmingham and Cardiff councils. The Green Party also supports the introduction of a living wage, believing that the national minimum wage should be 60% of net national average earnings. Sinn Féin also supports the introduction of a living wage for Northern Ireland. Other supporters include The Guardian newspaper columnist Polly Toynbee, Church Action on Poverty, the Scottish Low Pay Unit, and Bloomsbury Fightback!.

Republic of Ireland
There has been an active living wage campaign in the Republic of Ireland since 2014. It is supported by The Vincentian Partnership for Social Justice (VPSJ), Nevin Economic Research Institute (NERI), TASC, Social Justice Ireland, UCD School of Social Policy, Social Work and Social Justice, SIPTU, Unite the Union and the Society of St Vincent de Paul.

Below is a table of the hourly minimum wage (for adults), and the living wage recommended by the living wage campaign, for each year since 2014.

It is calculated on the basis of the VPSJ’s Minimum Essential Standard of Living (MESL) research, and set by the Living Wage Technical Group, benchmarked against the cost of minimum standard of living. It is supported by the political parties Sinn Féin, Labour and the Social Democrats, while Solidarity–People Before Profit recommend a living wage of €15. Aontú support a living wage, with different regional rates, and have also recommended a "living pension."

It has been opposed by employers including Ibec and the Irish Small Firms Association (ISFA), while the supermarket chains Lidl and Aldi committed to pay all their employees the living wage in 2020.

In 2021, the Low Pay Commission began to study the living wage, and to decide if there should be different living wages for different age categories or regions.

Asia Floor Wage
Launched in 2009, Asia Floor Wage is a loose coalition of labour and other groups seeking to implement a Living Wage throughout Asia, with a particular focus on textile manufacturing. There are member associations in Bangladesh, Cambodia, Hong Kong S.A.R., India, Indonesia, Malaysia, Pakistan, the Philippines, Sri Lanka, Thailand and Turkey as well as supporters in Europe and North America. The campaign targets multinational employers who do not pay their developing world workers a living wage.

United States living wage campaigns

New York City

The proposed law will inform tax-payers of where their investment dollars go and will hold developers to more stringent employment standards. The proposed act will require developers who receive substantial tax-payer funded subsidies to pay employees a minimum living wage. The law is designed to raise quality of life and stimulate local economy. Specifically the proposed act will guarantee that workers in large developmental projects will receive a wage of at least $10.00 an hour. The living wage will get indexed so that it keeps up with cost of living increases. Furthermore, the act will require that employees who do not receive health insurance from their employer will receive an additional $1.50 an hour to subsidize their healthcare expenses. Workers employed at a subsidized development will also be entitled to the living wage guarantee.

Many city officials have opposed living wage requirements because they believe that they restrict business climate thus making cities less appealing to potential industries. Logistically cities must hire employees to administer the ordinance. Conversely advocates for the legislation have acknowledged that when wages aren't sufficient, low-wage workers are often forced to rely on public assistance in the form of food stamps or Medicaid.

James Parrott of the Fiscal Policy Institute testified during a May 2011 New York City Council meeting that real wages for low-wage workers in the city have declined substantially over the last 20 years, despite dramatic increases in average education levels. A report by the Fiscal Policy Institute indicated that business tax subsidies have grown two and a half times faster than overall New York City tax collections and asks why these public resources are invested in poverty-level jobs. Mr. Parrott testified that income inequality in New York City exceeds that of other large cities, with the highest-earning 1 percent receiving 44 percent of all income.

Miami-Dade County
The Community Coalition for a Living Wage (CCLW) was launched in 1997 in Miami, Florida, as a partnership between local anti-poverty and labor organizations Catalyst Miami, Legal Services of Greater Miami, and the South Florida AFL–CIO. The CCLW organized the successful campaign for the passage of a Miami-Dade County living wage ordinance in 1999, the first of its kind in the South. The ordinance requires Miami-Dade County and its contractors to pay all employees a living wage pegged to inflation: $12.63/hr with benefits, or $15 without (as of 2018).

University of Virginia
In February 2012, a Living Wage Campaign at the University of Virginia released a series of demands to University administrators calling for a living wage policy at the University. These demands included a requirement that the University "explicitly address" the issue by 17 February. Although University President Teresa Sullivan did respond to the demands in a mass email sent to the University community shortly before the end of the day on 17 February, the Campaign criticized her response as "intentionally misleading" and vowed to take action.

On 18 February, the campaign announced that 12 students would begin a hunger strike to publicize the plight of low-paid workers.

Criticism
Criticisms against the implementation living wage laws have taken similar forms to those against minimum wage. Economically, both can be analyzed as a price floor for labor. A price floor, if above the equilibrium price and thus effective, necessarily leads to a surplus. This means the number of employees an employer is willing to hire at a living wage is below the number they would be willing to hire at the equilibrium wage price. Many argue that, in the context of a labor market, this would reduce the macroeconomic aggregate demand for labor across all employers, and so presume setting the minimum wage at a living wage would possibly raise unemployment. Rehn and Meidner instead proposed a higher minimum wage would induce productivity growth from structural change, reorganizing workers into different jobs across employers with different microeconomic labor demands, rather than reducing aggregate demand for labor. A large amount of empirical study has focused on the employment effects of minimum wage, much of it following a study by David Card and Alan Krueger finding no difference in unemployment rates in two states following a minimum wage increase in one.

A contention that often impedes the progression of a living wage ordinance has to do with the scope; it is controversial whether it should apply to an individual or an entire family as wages can be nuanced when there are multiple types of households among a state. Potential solutions to the complexity of a living wage ordinance include a “specific employer provision,” which seeks to evaluate the pros and cons to a living wage on a company to company basis. An argument In favor of this approach asserts that it can help bolster employee morale and increase social capital.

Critics have warned of not just an increase in unemployment but also price increases and a lack of entry level jobs due to labor substitutions effects. The voluntary undertaking of a living wage is criticized as impossible due to the competitive advantage other businesses in the same market would have over the one adopting a living wage. The economic argument would be that, ceteris paribus (all other things being equal), a company that paid its workers more than required by the market would be unable to compete with those that pay according to market rates.

Another issue that has emerged is that living wages may be a less effective anti-poverty tool than other measures. Authors point to living wages as being only a limited way of addressing the problems of rising economic inequality, the increase of long-term low-wage jobs, and a decline of unions and legal protection for workers. Since living wage ordinances attempt to address the issue of a living wage, defined by some of its proponents as a family wage, rather than as an individual wage, many of the beneficiaries may already be in families that make substantially more than that necessary to provide an adequate standard of living; this argument focuses on the portion benefitting who are in poverty, rather than the portion in poverty who are benefitting. According to a survey of labor economists by the Employment Policies Institute in 2000, only 31% viewed living wages as a very or somewhat effective anti-poverty tool, while 98% viewed policies like the US earned income tax credit and general welfare grants in a similar vein. On the other hand, according to Zagros Madjd-Sadjadi, an economist with the State of California's Division of Labor Statistics and Research, the living wage may be seen by the public as preferable to other methods because it reinforces the work ethic and ensures that there is something of value produced, unlike welfare, that is often believed to be a pure cash "gift" from the public coffers."

The concept of a living wage based on its definition as a family wage has been criticized by some for emphasizing the role of men as breadwinners.

See also

 Cost of living
 Distributism
 Family wage
 Guaranteed minimum income
 Labor market
 Maximum wage
 Minimum wage
 Positive rights
 Precarious work
 Solidarity wage
 Supply and demand
 Trade Boards Act 1909
 Working poor

Notes

References
 S Webb and B Webb, Industrial Democracy (Longmans 1902)
 Ryan, John A. Living Wage Macmillan, New York 1906 
 Gertner, Jon, "What is a Living Wage?", The New York Times, 15 January 2006
 Madjd-Sadjadi, Zagros, Living Wages: The Issues and the Impact Division of Labor Statistics and Research, California Department of Industrial Relations, San Francisco, 2001
 Sklar, Holly; Mykyta, Laryssa; Wefald, Susan, "Raise The Floor: Wages and Policies That Work For All Of Us", 2002, South End Press. South End Press | Raise the Floor 
 Nadeem, Shehzad, "The Living Wage Movement and the Economics of Morality,", Research in Social Movements, Conflicts, and Change 28: 137–67 (2008)

External links

 Living Wage Calculator – New York City: minimum wage/living wage/poverty wage (PSU).
 Living Wage Calculator (PSU).
 Living Wage Calculator (MIT).
 .
 Universal Living Wage Campaign.
 ACORN Living Wage campaign.
 Economic Policy Institute – Living Wage
 Economic Policy Institute – Family Budget Calculator.
 London Living Wage Unit page
 New York Living Wage Campaign.
 LaborFair Resources – Fair Labor Practices.
 Living Wage Campaign at The University of Virginia.
 Use IE techniques to determine Living Wage (Doug Miller, Northumbria University, UK).
 Measuring the Full Impact of Minimum and Living Wage Laws (Dollars & Sense Magazine).
 Living Wages, Rarity for U.S. Fast-Food Workers, Served Up in Denmark. The New York Times. (October 2014).

Wages and salaries
Catholic social teaching